Yosyf Shumlyansky (1643–1708) was an Eastern Catholic (previously Orthodox) bishop of the Eparchy of Lviv, Halych and Kamianets-Podilskyi (at the time in the Polish–Lithuanian Commonwealth), best known for restoring unity with the Holy See in year 1700.

Biography

Yosyf Shumlyansky fought with Jan Sobieski in the defense of Vienna. In 1667, he was elected as Orthodox bishop of Lviv, but the see was contested until 1676.

When Yosyf was elected Orthodox bishop, the bishop of Przemyśl opposed him. Also the Lviv fraternity opposed the candidacy, preferring instead their own candidate Jeremiah, who was ordained as well. There was a fierce struggle among the two bishops, which lasted about five years. Only with the accession of Jan Sobieski to the Polish throne, a personal friend of Yosyf, the latter managed to defeat his opponent.
In 1675, as Bishop of Lviv, he was also appointed administrator to the Diocese of Kyiv. In 1677, after contacts with the papal nuncio in Warsaw Yosyf Shumlyansky adopted Catholicism. At a locale council in 1700, Yosyf and the clergy of his diocese joined the Union of Brest under the leadership of the Metropolitan of Kiev, Galicia and all Ruthenia — Lev Zalenskyj. The Lviv brotherhood first refused to follow the bishop and tried to remain Orthodox, but eventually relented and in 1708 also joined the union, directly subordinated to the Roman Curia.

Shumlyansky instructed the clergy to keep metrics, and he published instructions on how to behave in the church and outside it. 

Shumlyansky was acquainted with the Hetmans Peter Doroshenko and Ivan Mazepa.

References
 Encyclopedia of Ukraine. In 10 vols. / Editor in Chief Vladimir Kubiyovych. - Paris, New York City: Young Life, 1954-1989
 Mykola Andrusiak. "Józef Szumlański, pierwszy biskup unicki lwowski, 1667-1708 (Open Library". Openlibrary.org. Retrieved 2012-08-25.
 "Lemberg". Catholic Encyclopedia. New York: Robert Appleton Company. 1913.
 "Greek Catholics in America". Catholic Encyclopedia. New York: Robert Appleton Company. 1913.

External links
 http://www.rulex.ru/01090529.htm
 http://litopys.org.ua/suspil/sus137.htm
 http://www.pravoslavie.ru/archiv/uniazaprus.htm

1643 births
1708 deaths
Converts to Eastern Catholicism from Eastern Orthodoxy
Ruthenian nobility of the Polish–Lithuanian Commonwealth
Former Ukrainian Orthodox Christians
18th-century Eastern Catholic bishops
Bishops of the Ukrainian Greek Catholic Church
Bishops in Ukraine